Irina Vostrikova (born 30 August 1970) is a Russian heptathlete. She represented her country in the heptathlon at the 1997 World Championships in Athletics and was a medallist in the indoor pentathlon at the European Athletics Indoor Championships in 1996 and 2000. She was also a silver medallist in the heptathlon at the 1997 Summer Universiade. Professionally, she placed sixth at the 1998 Hypo-Meeting and eighth at the 2000 Hypo-Meeting. She was the 1997 winner at the Russian Athletics Championships.

International competitions

See also
List of European Athletics Indoor Championships medalists (women)

References

1970 births
Living people
Russian heptathletes
Universiade medalists in athletics (track and field)
Universiade silver medalists for Russia
Medalists at the 1997 Summer Universiade
World Athletics Championships athletes for Russia
Russian Athletics Championships winners